Peete is a surname. Notable people with the surname include:

Calvin Peete (1943–2015), American professional golfer
Charlie Peete (1929–1956), American professional baseball player
Louise Peete (1880–1947), American serial killer; executed in the gas chamber
Holly Robinson Peete (born 1964), American actress and singer; wife of Rodney Peete
Rodney Peete (born 1966), American professional football player; brother of Skip Peete
Skip Peete (born 1963), American professional football coach; brother of Rodney Peete

See also
Peet § Surname
Pete (surname)